Sappho (1818) is a tragedy by Austrian playwright Franz Grillparzer.

Plot
The plot is based on a tradition that Sappho, a poet of ancient Greece, threw herself from the high Lesbian cliffs into the sea when she found that her love for the youth Phaon was unrequited, and that he preferred her maid, named Melitta in the play, to her.

Background
Following the success of his first great tragedy of fate, Die Ahnfrau (The Ancestress), which was written in 16 days, Franz Grillparzer wrote this second poetic drama, Sappho, also composed at white heat, and resembling Die Ahnfrau in the general character of its poetry although differing from it in form and spirit. In its conception, Sappho is half way between a tragedy of fate and a more modern tragedy of character; in its form, too, it is half way between the classical and the modern. An attempt is made to combine the passion and sentiment of modern life with the simplicity and grace of ancient masterpieces. Its classic spirit is much like that of Goethe's Torquato Tasso; Grillparzer unrolls the tragedy of poetic genius, the renunciation of earthly happiness imposed upon the poet by her higher mission.

Evaluation
Edith J. R. Isaacs evaluates the play in the 1920 edition of Encyclopedia Americana as follows:

Notes

References
 
 

Attribution
 

1818 plays
Austrian plays
German-language plays
Biographical plays about writers
Plays set in ancient Greece
Plays based on real people
Plays by Franz Grillparzer
Cultural depictions of Sappho
Plays set in the 6th century BC